is a Japanese voice actress from Hidaka District, Wakayama.

Roles

Television animation
Avatar: The Last Airbender (Aang)
Fushigiboshi no Futago Hime Gyu! (Lemon)
I"s Pure (Itsuki Akiba)
Joshikōsei Girl's High (K-Ko)
Kashimashi: Girl Meets Girl (Michiko)
Pani Poni Dash! (Yuzuko Kurusu)
Sketchbook ~full color'S~ (Natsumi Asō)
Super Gals! Kotobuki Ran (Midori Asahi)

External links
Asuka's blog
 

1980 births
Japanese voice actresses
Living people
Voice actors from Wakayama Prefecture